The Dvaravati Sila is a type of Sila or coral stone obtained from the Gomati river (Gomti River) in Dvaraka. Dvaraka is located in the Jamnagar District of Gujarat at the mouth of the Gomati River as it debouches into the Gulf of Kutch. The city lies in the westernmost part of India. In ancient Sanskrit literature, Dvaraka was called Dvarawati and was listed as one of the seven prehistoric cities in the country. Thus, the Sila or the stone obtained at the mouth of the Gomati river is called the Dvaravati Sila and is used in worship.

Dvaraka Silas are coral with chakra (wheel) markings and the chakra-mark is the most distinguishing feature of these stones, and hence they are called ‘chakrankita-sila’.

Aniconic representation of God is by a symbol rather than an image. Indian art overwhelmingly prefers the iconic image, but some aniconism does occur in folk worship, in early Hinduism in the form of Vishnu's Saligrama Sila (murthi) (fossil stone), Dvaravati Sila (coral stone), Govardhana Sila (stone from the Govardhan hill),  etc. They have solar significance, and their use in worship is very common among all sects of Vaishnavites of Hindu religion.

Dvaraka 
The legendary city of Dvaraka in Hindu history was the dwelling place of Krishna. Dwarka or Dvaraka is derived from 'Dwar', a door, and in ancient times its flourishing port was considered to be the gateway to the main land. As 'Ka' means 'Brahma' meaning gateway to Moksha (salvation). It is also called Dwarkamati and Dwarkavati or Dvaravati. The famous Nageswar Jyotirlinga near Dwaraka is made of a large Dwaraka Sila.

The Hindu scriptures prescribe that stones obtained from Dvaraka only for worship even though geologically it may be found in other places too.

Scriptural sanctions

There are several schools of thought among the learned acharyas of the Vaishnava sect on the worship of this Sila. This Sila is worshipped, along with or independent of Sila (murthi) or Saligrama Sila, in some parts of the country (among Vaishnavites of Saurashtra, Bengal and Maharashtra; the Madhva sect in Karnataka), particularly in the Vaishnava tradition. It is worshipped along with the Sila| Saligrama Sila (stone) since scriptures consider it auspicious to do so. According to Skanda Purana, wherever Dvaraka Sila is placed in front of the Sila|, every class of magnificence goes on increasing unlimitedly. Skanda Purana also says that one who daily worships Dvaraka Sila along with twelve Saligrama Silas will be honored even in Vaikuntha.

Traits
The chakra-mark is the most distinguishing feature of the Dvaravati stones, and hence they are called "chakrankita-sila". According to Garuda Purana, there are twelve varieties of this stone, owing to the number of chakras (wheels), colours and forms (Sanskrit sloka in this regard states:‘dasadha cha prabhinnas ta varnakrti-vibhedatah’). When there is only one chakra, the stone is called Devesa; when there are two chakras, it is Sudarshana; three chakras represent the deity Ananta.  When there are four chakras, the stone is Janardana. Vasudeva is represented by the stone having five chakras, Pradyumna by six chakras, Bala-bhadra by seven, Purushottama by eight, Nava-vyuha by nine, Dasavatara by ten, Aniruddha by eleven and Dvadastma by twelve. Nava-vyuha represents the collection of nine forms of Vishnu: Vasudeva, Samkarshana, Pradyumna, Aniruddha, Narayana, Hayagriva, Vishnu, Nrsimha and Varaha. The first four forms are well known as ‘chatur-vyuha’. The twelve major forms of Vishnu are derived from these nine forms, according to the Tantra siddhanta, a division of Pancharatra.

Prahlada Samhita, quoted in Salagrama-pariksha (by Anupasimha) gives the first few names differently. The Dvaravati Sila with only one chakra is called Sudarsana, with two chakras 'Lakshmi-narayana' and with three chkras 'Trivikrama'. The rest of the names are the same as given above. The name Ananta is given to stones which have more than twelve chakras. The name for Dasavatara in the above list is given here as 'Dasamurti'. When the chakras are more than twelve, only even numbered chakras are to be preferred, according to Galava-smrtir.

Benefits
These Silas also have distinct personalities like the Saligrama Sila that are identified by their size, colure, texture markings; these are explained below.

I.Sudarshana: one chakra - salvation

II.Lakshmi-Narayana: two chakras- salvation
 
III.Trivikrama: three chakras - freedom from the fear of births and deaths
 
IV.Janardana: four chakras - fulfillment of desires

V.Vasudeva: five chakras - obtainment of prosperity and elimination of enemies

VI.Pradyumna: six chakras - wealth and lustre

VII.Baladeva: seven chakras - continuation of progeny and celebrity

VIII.Purushottama: eight chakras - satisfaction of all that one aspires for

IX.Navavyuha (the collection of nine forms of Vishnu): nine chakras - rewards, which are difficult, even for the gods to obtain

X.Dashmurti (the ten incarnations of Vishnu): ten chakras - sovereignty and prosperity

XI.Aniruddha: eleven chakras - lordship

XII.Dvadasatmaka: twelve chakras - final emancipation

XIII.Ananta: more than twelve chakras - fulfills one’s desires (only even numbered chakras are to be preferred)

The colour and the shape of the sila is said to give following effects.

Ø White stones are considered most suitable for worship and will make for a worldly prosperity in all aspects and spiritual welfare

Ø Dark (blue-black) stones forebode death

Ø Tawny ones cause anxiety

Ø Multi-coloured ones bring about disease and sorrow Ø Yellow ones take away wealth

Ø Smoke coloured ones produce loss of wealth

Ø Blue stones will bring about obstacles to any undertaking

Ø Round in shape or square auspicious

Ø Triangular or uneven in shape inauspicious

See also
Murti

References 

 Sudarśana Cakra on Stone at Dvārakā, Skanda Purana

Stones
Vaishnavism